Juno Dawson (born 10 June 1981) is a British author of young adult fiction and non-fiction. Dawson's notable works include This Book Is Gay, Mind Your Head, Margot & Me, The Gender Games, Clean and Meat Market.

Life and career 
Dawson was born at Bradford Royal Infirmary in West Yorkshire.  Dawson lived in Bingley and was educated at Bingley Grammar School. After graduating from Bangor University, she worked as a primary school teacher and later became a PSHE co-ordinator. While working as a teacher, she began writing books aimed at young adults and became successful enough to leave her job. She wrote a number of young adult fiction books including Hollow Pike and Say Her Name. Her books often feature LGBT people, and Dawson has advocated for other books to feature more prominent LGBT characters.

In September 2014,This Book Is Gay, was first published in the UK with subsequent publication in the US in June 2015. The book is a "manual to all areas of life as an LGBT person." Several months after US publication, in November, the book was challenged in Wasilla, Alaska when a petition was started to remove the book from a public library, with a number of residents objecting to profanity and sexually explicit content. Dawson responded by saying the event highlighted how "there is still such small-mindedness and hatred left to contend with." In the same year, Dawson received the Queen of Teen award.

In 2015, Dawson came out as a transgender woman, having begun her journey of transitioning 18 months prior. She began hormonal transition in early 2016. She was signed to write a column in Glamour magazine documenting her experience of transitioning. She represents the LGBT charity Stonewall as a School Role Model. Dawson sat on the judging panel for the 2016 BBC Young Writers' Award.

In 2017, Dawson published The Gender Games, her first book aimed at adults, discussing themes of gender as well as her own life experiences. Television rights to the book were acquired in 2018 by SunnyMarch, the production company founded by Benedict Cumberbatch.

In early 2018, it was announced Dawson would write The Good Doctor, one of the first Doctor Who novels to feature the Thirteenth Doctor as played by Jodie Whittaker. The novel was released in October 2018. As well as writing a novel, Dawson wrote the BBC Sounds spin-off podcast Doctor Who: Redacted, which launched in April 2022. She has also contributed audio plays for the Big Finish Torchwood range. Dawson was supposed to write an episode for the second series of Class, but the show was cancelled.

Dawson has small acting roles in I May Destroy You and Holby City.

In 2022, Dawson's This Book is Gay was listed among 52 books banned by the Alpine School District following the implementation of Utah law H.B. 374, “Sensitive Materials In Schools."

Awards 
In 2014 Dawson won the 'Queen of Teen' award, a biennial prize (discontinued in 2016) for young adult fiction writers.

Her novel, 'Meat Market' won the YA Book Prize 2020.

'Her Majesty's Royal Coven' won the 2022 Books Are My Bag Reader's Award for Best Fiction.

Works 
 Hollow Pike (2012)
 Cruel Summer (2013)
 Being a Boy (2013)
 Say Her Name (2014)
 This Book Is Gay (2014)
 Under My Skin (2015)
 All of the Above (2015)
 Mind Your Head (2016)
 Torchwood: The Dollhouse (2016)
 Spot the Difference - written for World Book Day (2016)
 Margot & Me (2017)
 The Gender Games (2017)
 What is Gender? How Does it Define Us? and Other Big Questions (2017)
 Grave Matter (2017)
 Torchwood: Orr (2017)
 Clean (2018)
 Doctor Who: The Good Doctor (2018)
 Meat Market (2019)
 Proud (2019)
 Wonderland (2020)
 Whats The T? (2021)
 Stay Another Day (2021)
 Her Majesty’s Royal Coven (2022)
 Doctor Who: Redacted (2022) - BBC audio drama
 The Shadow Cabinet (2023)

References

External links 
 
 

1981 births
Living people
Alumni of Bangor University
People educated at Bingley Grammar School
People from Bingley
21st-century British women writers
British writers of young adult literature
English science fiction writers
English LGBT writers
Transgender actresses
Transgender women
Transgender writers
Transgender rights activists
Writers of Doctor Who novels
English LGBT actors